Rubén Blanco Rodríguez (born 15 June 1993), simply known as Rubo Blanco is a Spanish footballer who plays for Bruno's Magpies as a forward.

Club career
Born in Madrid, Blanco graduated from the youth academy of CD Numancia and made his debut with the senior team in a 0–0 draw against FC Cartagena on 3 December 2011. On 3 August 2012, he was loaned out to Real Ávila CF. After a stint with Deportivo Alavés B, Blanco joined Segunda División B club UP Langreo in 2014. After having contributed with 2 goals in eighteen matches, he stepped a division down and joined CD Tuilla in January 2015.

On 14 July 2015, Blanco moved to fellow club SCR Peña Deportiva, after agreeing to a one-year deal. In the subsequent years, he played for UC Ceares, Atlético Tordesillas and SD Borja (scoring three goals in 12 appearances), before returning to Atlético Tordesillas on 23 January 2017 due to personal reasons.

On 22 August 2017, Blanco moved abroad and signed with Gibraltarian club Mons Calpe. After scoring 15 goals in his first season at the club, he was signed by Europa. However, after just 3 league games, Rubo left the club after being found guilty of irregular betting activities alongside a number of other Europa FC players. For his part, he was banned for 6 months by the Gibraltar Football Association.

Statistics

References

External links

1993 births
Living people
Association football forwards
Spanish footballers
CD Numancia B players
CD Numancia players
Deportivo Alavés B players
F.C. Bruno's Magpies players
Europa F.C. players
UP Langreo footballers
Mons Calpe S.C. players
Segunda División players
Segunda División B players
Tercera División players
Spanish expatriate footballers
UC Ceares players
Gibraltar National League players